The 2014 African Women's Handball Cup Winners' Cup was the 30th edition, organized by the African Handball Confederation, under the auspices of the International Handball Federation, the handball sport governing body. The tournament was held from May 19–30, 2014 in Oyo, Republic of the Congo, contested by 8 teams and won by Atlético Petróleos de Luanda of Angola.

Draw

Preliminary rounds

Times given below are in WAT UTC+1.

Group A

* Note:  Advance to quarter-finals

Group B

* Note:  Advance to quarter-finals

Knockout stage
Championship bracket

5-8th bracket

Final standings

See also 
2014 African Women's Handball Champions League

References

External links 
 CAHB official website

African Women's Handball Cup Winner's Cup
2014 in African handball